Jeniferever is a band from Uppsala, Sweden formed in 1996. Their music could be described as ambient indie rock or post-rock; it is slow-paced, melodic, and frequently building to an orchestral-like climax. Their sound has been compared to bands such as The Appleseed Cast and Sigur Rós. Their name is derived from a 1989 Smashing Pumpkins song of the same name.

They released a four track EP Iris on the Big Scary Monsters Recording Company label. Their debut full-length record Choose a Bright Morning was released on Drowned in Sound Recordings and was later re-released through Monotreme Records. Their second album Spring Tides was released on Monotreme Records in 2009. The band released its third album Silesia on 11 April 2011. A track from Silesia, "Waifs & Strays", was released for free download in January 2011. The band have not officially announced that they have disbanded, but have been on a long-term hiatus since 2012.

Members
Kristofer Jönson – lead vocals, guitar, keyboards
Martin Sandström – guitar, backing vocals
Olle Bilius – bass, guitar, keyboards, backing vocals
Fredrik Aspelin – drums, backing vocals

Discography

Albums
Choose a Bright Morning (2006)
Spring Tides (2009)
Silesia (2011)

EPs
Chronicles of Omega (2001) 
Jeniferever (2002)
Jeniferever / The Next Autumn Soundtrack (split EP with The Next Autumn Soundtrack) (2003) 
Iris (2004)
Nangijala (2008)

Singles
"From Across the Sea" (2006)
"The Sound of Beating Wings" (2006)
"Alvik" (2006)
"To the Beat of Our Own Blood" (2011)

References

External links

Swedish post-rock groups
Musical groups from Uppsala
Musical groups established in 1996